Pedicini is an Italian surname. Notable people with the surname include:

Piernicola Pedicini (born 1969), Italian politician
Roberto Pedicini (born 1962), Italian actor and voice actor
Valentina Pedicini (1978–2020), Italian screenwriter and film director

Italian-language surnames